Venerable may refer to:

 The Venerable, an honorific style used in Christianity and Buddhism for particular titles
 , several Royal Navy ships
 Venerable (album), a 2011 album by KEN mode

See also
 Veneration, the act of honoring a saint, a person who has been identified as having a high degree of sanctity or holiness